Major Malfunction is the debut album of American drummer Keith LeBlanc, produced by Fats Comet (one of several aliases of Tackhead), and released in 1986 by World Records. The vinyl release plays continuously from beginning to end on sides A and B, while the World and Cleopatra CD releases index each side as a track. This production was ground breaking in 1986 and copied by many.

Despite the almost universal reference to this album as "Major Malfunction," the cover clearly shows "Major Malfuction" as being the title. This was corrected on the Select Cuts reissue.

Track listing 

The Cleopatra version was erroneously mastered, with Side 2 as track 1 and vice versa.

Personnel 

Musicians
Keith LeBlanc – drums, percussion, keyboards, editing, engineering
Skip McDonald – guitar, keyboards, engineering
Nick Plytas – keyboards
Adrian Sherwood – sampler, programming, engineering, mixing
Doug Wimbish – bass guitar, keyboards, guitar
Dog – keyboards ("Move")

Technical personnel
Fats Comet – producer
Kevin Metcalfe – mastering
Bonjo Iyabinghi Noah – percussion ("Move")

Charts

Release history

References

External links 
 

1986 albums
Keith LeBlanc albums